Tremont Theatre was a theater constructed in about 1910 with seating for 942. It was located on Webster Avenue and East 178th Street, beside a New York Telephone Company building. One of the earliest purpose-built cinemas, it was known by various names during its use including Tremont Yiddish Theatre, Cinema Tremont, Moss's Tremont Avenue and the Hamilton Theater. It was located on East Tremont Avenue. The theater closed around 1960.

Organ Specifications:
It had a II/7 "Style 3" Wurlitzer, Op. 9 in 1912 and an M. P. Moller pipe organ, Opus 2952, 3 Manual/17 Rank installed in 1921 at a cost of $8,000.

References

Theatres in the Bronx
1910 establishments in New York City
1960 disestablishments in New York (state)
Former theatres in the United States
20th century in the Bronx

Theatres completed in 1910